Harcourt Vanden-Bempde-Johnstone, 1st Baron Derwent (3 January 1829 – 1 March 1916), known as Sir Harcourt Vanden-Bempde-Johnstone, 3rd Baronet, from 1869 to 1881, was a British peer and Liberal Party politician. He served for ten years as a Member of Parliament (MP), before becoming a peer with a seat in the House of Lords.

Career
Derwent was the son of Sir John Vanden-Bempde-Johnstone, 2nd Baronet, and Louisa Augusta Venables-Vernon-Harcourt, daughter of the Most Reverend Edward Venables-Vernon-Harcourt, Archbishop of York. He succeeded as second Baronet on the death of his father in 1869 and the same year he also succeeded his father as MP for Scarborough, a seat he held until 1880. In 1881 he was raised to the peerage as Baron Derwent, of Hackness in the North Riding of the County of York.

As a young man he served as a lieutenant in the 2nd Life Guards, and on 22 January 1863 he was commissioned as major in the 1st Administrative Brigade of Yorkshire (East Riding) Artillery Volunteers.

Family
Lord Derwent married Charlotte Mills, daughter of Sir Charles Mills, 1st Baronet, of Hillingdon Court, in 1850. They had nine children:
 Francis, 2nd Baron Derwent, born 26 May 1851, died 30 April 1929
 Hilda Vanden-Bempde-Johnstone, died young, March 1853
 Hon. Edward Henry Vanden-Bempde-Johnstone, born 27 November 1854, died 29 April 1903
 Hon. Cecil C.E. Vanden-Bempde-Johnstone, born 26 December 1856, died 29 January 1933
 Sir Alan Vanden-Bempde-Johnstone, GCVO, born 31 August 1858, died 31 July 1932
 Hon. Edith Vanden-Bempde-Johnstone, born 7 June 1860
 Hon. Louis Vanden-Bempde-Johnstone, born 25 February 1862, died 12 December 1922
 Mary Vanden-Bempde-Johnstone, died young 1865
 Hon. Gilbert Vanden-Bempde-Johnstone, 25 September 1865, died 5 January 1949

Lady Derwent died in 1901. Lord Derwent survived her by fifteen years and died in March 1916, aged 87. He was succeeded in his titles by his eldest son Francis.

Notes

References
Burke's Peerage, Baronetage and Knightage, 100th Edn, London, 1953. 
Kidd, Charles, Williamson, David (editors). Debrett's Peerage and Baronetage (1990 edition). New York: St Martin's Press, 1990,

External links 
 

Derwent, Harcourt Vanden-Bempde-Johnstone, 1st Baron
Derwent, Harcourt Vanden-Bempde-Johnstone, 1st Baron
Derwent, Harcourt Vanden-Bempde-Johnstone, 1st Baron
Liberal Party (UK) MPs for English constituencies
UK MPs 1868–1874
UK MPs 1874–1880
UK MPs who were granted peerages
People from the Borough of Scarborough
Peers of the United Kingdom created by Queen Victoria